This is a list of Croatian television related events from 2016.

Events
23 April - Ruža Janjiš wins the second season of The Voice – Najljepši glas Hrvatske.
3 June - Romano Obilinović wins the sixth season of Big Brother.

Debuts
17 April - Big Brother (2004-2008, 2016–present)

Television shows

2010s
The Voice – Najljepši glas Hrvatske (2015–present)
X Factor Adria (2015–present)

Ending this year

Births

Deaths

See also
2016 in Croatia